An oeil-de-boeuf, also œil de bœuf and sometimes anglicized as ox-eye window, is a relatively small  elliptical or circular  window, typically for an upper storey, and sometimes set in a roof slope as a dormer, or above a door to let in natural light.

Windows of this type are commonly found in the grand architecture of Baroque France. The term is also applied to similar round windows, such as those found in Georgian architecture in Great Britain, and later Greek Revival and Colonial Revival styles in North America, so that must be considered part of the usage. The term initially applied to horizontal elliptical windows, but is also used for vertical ones.

The spread is not limited to ecclesiastical architecture. This type of window can also be found in the late Romanesque period in the area of secular architecture in the castles of  Frederick II of Hohenstaufen, Holy Roman Emperor from 1220 to 1250, (Castel del Monte, Palazzo San Gervasio, on the donjon in the castle of Lucera, etc.), later also in  Renaissance palaces and villas and in the Baroque.

See also
Oculus (architecture)

References

Windows
Ancien Régime French architecture